What a Shame may refer to:

"What a Shame" (Shinedown song), a song by Shinedown on their 2008 album The Sound of Madness
"What a Shame", a song by The Rolling Stones on their 1965 album The Rolling Stones No. 2